Orthenches chartularia is a moth of the family Plutellidae first described by Edward Meyrick in 1924. It is endemic to New Zealand and can be found in the North and South Islands. This species inhabits open grassy areas in native subalpine forest. Adults are on the wing in January and February.

Taxonomy 
This species was first described by Edward Meyrick in 1924 and named Orthenches chartularia using a male specimen collected in January at Mount Ruapehu at 4,000 ft. by George Hudson. In 1927 Alfred Philpott, believing he was describing a new species, described this species and named it Orthenches nivalis. Philpott used a specimen collected at Arthur's Pass in February. George Hudson discussed and illustrated this species in his 1928 book The butterflies and moths of New Zealand. Philpott corrected his error in 1931, synonymising O. nivalis with O. chartularia. The male holotype specimen is held at the Natural History Museum, London.

Description

Meyrick described this species as follows:
Hudson pointed out that this species is variable in the intensity and extent of the black markings on its forewings.

Distribution and habitat
This species is endemic to New Zealand and can be found in the North and South Islands. The preferred habitat of this species is open grassy areas in native subalpine forest.

Behaviour 
Adults of this species are on the wing in January and February.

References 

Plutellidae
Moths of New Zealand
Moths described in 1924
Endemic fauna of New Zealand
Taxa named by Edward Meyrick
Endemic moths of New Zealand